Kim Hughes (born June 4, 1952) is an American former basketball player and coach.  He played professional basketball in the American Basketball Association (ABA) and the National Basketball Association (NBA) with the New York / New Jersey Nets, Denver Nuggets, and Milwaukee Bucks between 1975 and 1981. Hughes served as the interim head coach for the Los Angeles Clippers for 33 games in 2010. On July 4, 2015, he was fired from his position as an assistant coach with the Portland Trail Blazers.

Playing career
The 6-foot-11 Hughes played college basketball at the University of Wisconsin from 1971 to 1974, averaging 15 points and 11 rebounds as a senior. His identical twin, Kerry, also 6-11, was also a starter on the Badgers. Hughes was selected by the Buffalo Braves in the third round (ninth pick) of the 1974 NBA draft; immediately, he played professionally in Italy during the 1974–75 season for Olimpia Milano. He spent the 1975–76 season with the New York Nets of the American Basketball Association (ABA), where he averaged eight points and nine rebounds and was named to the First Team ABA All-Rookie Team. The 1976 Nets team, which featured Julius Erving, Swen Nater, Larry Kenon and Brian Taylor, won the ABA championship.

Hughes spent two more seasons with the Nets after the franchise moved to the National Basketball Association (NBA). In July 1978, Hughes signed with the Denver Nuggets, where he played for two full seasons. Eight games into the 1980–81 NBA season, Hughes was traded to the Cleveland Cavaliers. He retired from the NBA at the end of the 1981 season, but continued to play professionally in Italy until 1989. During his ABA and NBA career, Hughes averaged 3.8 points and 5.6 rebounds per game, and had field goal and free throw percentages of 49.7% and 39.7%, respectively.

Career statistics

ABA

Regular season 

|-
| style="text-align:left;background:#afe6ba;" | 1975–76†
| align="left" | New York
| 84 || – || 25.7 || .530 || .000 || .455 || 9.2 || 0.7 || 1.2 || 1.4 || 8.2
|- class="sortbottom"
| style="text-align:center;" colspan="2"| Career
| 84 || – || 25.7 || .530 || .000 || .455 || 9.2 || 0.7 || 1.2 || 1.4 || 8.2
|}

Playoffs 

|-
| style="text-align:left;background:#afe6ba;" | 1975–76†
| align="left" | New York
| 12 || – || 22.2 || .509 || .000 || .400 || 6.0 || 0.8 || 0.8 || 1.1 || 5.0
|- class="sortbottom"
| style="text-align:center;" colspan="2"| Career
| 12 || – || 22.2 || .509 || .000 || .400 || 6.0 || 0.8 || 0.8 || 1.1 || 5.0
|}

NBA

Regular season 

|-
| align="left" | 1976–77
| align="left" | New York
| 81 || – || 25.7 || .427 || – || .275 || 7.0 || 1.2 || 1.5 || 1.5 || 4.0
|-
| align="left" | 1977–78
| align="left" | New Jersey
| 56 || – || 15.3 || .356 || – || .310 || 4.3 || 0.7 || 0.9 || 0.9 || 2.2
|-
| align="left" | 1978–79
| align="left" | Denver
| 81 || – || 13.4 || .538 || – || .400 || 4.1 || 0.9 || 0.7 || 1.3 || 2.6
|-
| align="left" | 1979–80
| align="left" | Denver
| 70 || – || 17.3 || .505 || .000 || .366 || 4.7 || 1.1 || 0.9 || 1.1 || 3.1
|-
| align="left" | 1980–81
| align="left" | Denver
| 8 || – || 19.9 || .440 || .000 || .500 || 6.3 || 1.4 || 1.4 || 1.8 || 2.9
|-
| align="left" | 1980–81
| align="left" | Cleveland
| 45 || – || 7.4 || .356 || .000 || .000 || 1.7 || 0.5 || 0.4 || 0.5 || 0.7
|- class="sortbottom"
| style="text-align:center;" colspan="2"| Career
| 341 || – || 16.8 || .449 || .000 || .333 || 4.7 || 0.9 || 0.9 || 1.1 || 2.7
|}

Playoffs 

|-
| align="left" | 1978–79
| align="left" | Denver
| 3 || – || 11.7 || .500 || – || .500 || 3.7 || 0.0 || 0.7 || 0.0 || 1.0
|- class="sortbottom"
| style="text-align:center;" colspan="2"| Career
| 3 || – || 11.7 || .500 || – || .500 || 3.7 || 0.0 || 0.7 || 0.0 || 1.0
|}

Coaching career
Hughes has worked as a scout and assistant coach with the NBA's Denver Nuggets, Milwaukee Bucks, Los Angeles Clippers, and Portland Trail Blazers.

In 2004, Hughes was diagnosed with prostate cancer, but the Clippers and Donald Sterling refused to cover the cost of his surgery.  Several Clippers players, including Corey Maggette, Chris Kaman, Marko Jarić and Elton Brand, chipped in to pay for Hughes' treatment. It turned out that the cancer was more advanced than previously thought and about to metastasize. The cost of the surgery was estimated by Hughes to be at least $70,000.

On February 4, 2010, Hughes replaced Mike Dunleavy, Sr. as the head coach of the Los Angeles Clippers. On April 15, 2010, Hughes was released from his duties as interim head coach after going 8–25.
On August 17, 2012, Hughes was named as an assistant coach for the Portland Trail Blazers. On July 4, 2015, it was reported that Kim Hughes was relieved of his duties as assistant coach of the Portland Trail Blazers due to circumstances related to media statements and free agency.

Head coaching record

|-
| style="text-align:left;"|L.A. Clippers
| style="text-align:left;"|
| 33 || 8 || 25 ||  || style="text-align:center;"|3rd in Pacific || — || — || — || —
| style="text-align:center;"|Missed playoffs
|- class="sortbottom"
| style="text-align:center;" colspan="2"|Career
| 33 || 8 || 25 ||  ||   || — || — || — || — ||

References

External links
 Kim Hughes coaching profile
 Kim Hughes' NBA statistics at basketball-reference

1952 births
Living people
American expatriate basketball people in Italy
American men's basketball coaches
American men's basketball players
Basketball coaches from Illinois
Basketball players from Illinois
Buffalo Braves draft picks
Centers (basketball)
Cleveland Cavaliers players
Denver Nuggets players
Lega Basket Serie A players
Los Angeles Clippers assistant coaches
Los Angeles Clippers head coaches
New Jersey Nets players
New York Nets players
Pallacanestro Virtus Roma players
People from Freeport, Illinois
Portland Trail Blazers assistant coaches
Twin sportspeople
Viola Reggio Calabria players
Wisconsin Badgers men's basketball players